Moonlight Shadow: The Collection is a compilation album by British multi-instrumentalist Mike Oldfield. It was released on 22 April 2013 in the United Kingdom. The title is from Oldfield and Maggie Reilly's 1983 song "Moonlight Shadow" which topped many European charts.

The album includes selections from Oldfield's recorded output with Mercury Records. Pieces from earlier in Oldfield's career were originally released on Virgin Records but have been subsequently moved to Mercury/Universal Music. It was Universal's third Oldfield compilation album in two years.

In 2019 a vinyl with a different track listing was issued with the same title and artwork.

Track listing

2013 CD release

2019 Vinyl release

References

External links
 
 

2013 compilation albums
Mike Oldfield compilation albums
Mercury Records compilation albums